Stefie Shock (stage name of Stéphan Caron) is a songwriter, multi-instrumentalist, producer and DJ from Montréal, Québec, Canada.
He has released 8 albums since 2000.

Discography
 Presque rien (2000)
Le Décor (2003)
Les Vendredis (2006)
Tubes, remixes et prémonitions (2009) (compilation)
La mécanique de l'amour (2011)
Avant L'aube (2014)
12 belles dans la peau (2016), 12 covers of Serge Gainsbourg songs with twelve French-Canadian actresses and singers: Klô Pelgag, Gaële, Fanny Bloom, Laurence Nerbonne, Pascale Bussières, SuzieMcLelove, Anne Dorval, Marie-Pierre Arthur, Marième, Evelyne Brochu, Sophie Beaudet, Stéphanie Lapointe.
Le fruit du hasard (2019)
Presque tout, Vol. 1 (2020) (compilation)
Godfree - LP1 (special issue)
Le décor (Édition spéciale 20e anniversaire)

Awards
2001: Rapsat-Lelièvre prize (Belgium)
2001: Socan prize "popular song" Amalgame (Les Respectables)
2002: Félix-Leclerc prize (at the FrancoFolies de Montréal)
2004: Félix Award at the ADISQ gala, Pop-rock Album, for Le Décor
2006: Socan prize "popular song" Ange gardien
2008: Socan prize "popular song" Pixel flous
2012: Socan prize "popular song" Un jour sur deux

See also
List of Quebec musicians
Music of Quebec
Culture of Quebec

References

External links
Official site
 

1969 births
Living people
Songwriters from Quebec
Canadian male singer-songwriters
French-language singers of Canada
Singers from Montreal